General elections were held in Malta on 22 February 1992. The Nationalist Party remained the largest party, winning 34 of the 65 seats.

The Labour party performed very poorly in the 1992 election, losing by nearly 13,000 votes. Mifsud Bonnici resigned due to deteriorating health and on the 26 March Labour elected Alfred Sant as the new leader.

Results

References

General elections in Malta
General
Malta
Malta